= Salmer 1973 =

Book of hymns

Salmer 1973 (1973 Hymns) is an official Church of Norway's hymnal that received royal assent on 7 September 1973. Salmer 1973 was a test hymnal and it was created to be used in the transitional period. When the church commission made a new hymnal in 1985, Salmer 1973 ceased to be used in the Church of Norway.
